Edward Lebbaeus Breeden Jr. (January 28, 1905 – June 1, 1990) was an American lawyer and politician who served for many decades as a member of the Virginia General Assembly, first in the House of Delegates and later in the Senate. In 1970, he became the first formal majority floor leader of the Senate, after a move to reduce the power of the President pro tempore.

References

External links
 

1905 births
1990 deaths
Politicians from Norfolk, Virginia
Democratic Party Virginia state senators
20th-century American politicians